Graça or Graca is a Portuguese surname and given name. Notable people with the name include:

Surname
Ailton Graça (born 1964), Brazilian actor
Alberto Graça (1918–?), Portuguese sailor
Ary Graça, Brazilian volleyball player
Carlos Graça (1931–2013), São Toméan politician 
Dias Graça (born 1964), Brazilian footballer
Emídio Graça (1931–1992), Portuguese footballer
Jaime Graça (1942–2012), Portuguese football player and coach
João Graça (born 1995), Portuguese footballer
Marco Da Graca (born 2002), Italian footballer
Marvin da Graça (born 1995), Luxembourg footballer
Ricardo Graça (born 1997), Brazilian footballer

Given name
Graça Aranha (1868–1931), Brazilian writer and diplomat
Graça Fonseca (born 1971), Portuguese politician 
Graça Freitas (born 1957), Portuguese physician
Graça Machel (born 1945), Mozambican politician and humanitarian

See also
Graça, municipality in Ceará, Brazil

Portuguese-language surnames